Falcon Baseball Field is a baseball venue located in Colorado Springs, Colorado, USA. It is home to the Air Force Falcons college baseball team of the Division I Mountain West Conference. Opened in 1957, the venue has a capacity of 1,000 spectators.

In both 1976 and 1995, the field hosted the United States Olympic Festivals.

Renovations
In 1991, the facility underwent major renovations. The most notable was the addition of an AstroTurf infield and new drainage systems; these allowed for better field conditions following inclement weather. Also, field dimensions were altered, and the dugouts were improved. The field features a 24-foot-high fence in right field. Seating capacity was expanded as well.

In 2010, the AstroTurf infield was replaced with Sport Turf, which has since been replaced with FieldTurf.

See also
 List of NCAA Division I baseball venues

References

College baseball venues in the United States
Baseball venues in Colorado
Air Force Falcons baseball